Malcolm Scott (born 17 May 1947) is a South African cricketer. He played in fifteen first-class matches from 1965/66 to 1971/72.

References

External links
 

1947 births
Living people
South African cricketers
Border cricketers
Gauteng cricketers
Cricketers from Pretoria